Foster Junction is an unincorporated community located in Ashland County, Wisconsin, United States. The community was named for George E. Foster, a partner in the Mellon Lumber Company. The company founded Foster Junction in 1910.

Foster Junction failed to thrive, and many of its buildings were dismantled and relocated to Mellen. Foster Junction no longer had any residents by the 1930s.

Notes

Unincorporated communities in Ashland County, Wisconsin
Unincorporated communities in Wisconsin